Safi Airport , , was an airport serving Safi, Morocco.

The airport is closed and has been built over. It's one of the smallest airports in Morocco that have been ever exist.
Only the smallest airline had landed here.

Google Earth historical imagery from 10/1/2004 shows the remains of  Runway 07/25 with building construction in progress. Current satellite image shows the area covered with streets and apartment blocks.

See also
Transport in Morocco

References

Airports in Morocco
Defunct airports in Morocco
Buildings and structures in Marrakesh-Safi